, also known as YBS, is a Japanese broadcast network affiliated with Nippon News Network (NNN) and Nippon Television Network System (NNS). Its headquarters is located in Kōfu, Yamanashi.

Network 
 TV: Nippon News Network (NNN)
 RADIO: Japan Radio Network (JRN), National Radio Network (NRN)

Stations

Digital TV(ID:4) 
Kōfu JOJF-DTV 25ch

Radio
Kōfu JOJF 765 kHz; 90.9 MHz FM

Programs

Radio
 YBS Radio news(YBSラジオニュース)
 YBS News up(YBSニュースアップ)
 YBS News halftime(YBSニュースハーフタイム)
 765morning
 765Music Express(765MUX)
 FUN TAME(ふぁん★タメ)
 Shoko Sawada's Saturday Jamboree(沢田聖子のサタデージャンボリー)
 RADIUS(ラヂウス)
 Yukko's POPSAT(ゆっこのポプサタ)
 DIG THE MUSIC
 FREE STYLE
 Hanchingu(はんちんぐ)

TV
 YBS News(YBSニュース)
 YBS Wide News(YBSワイドニュース)
 YBS Midnight News(YBSニュース深夜便)
 Tomo-chan chi no goji(ともちゃん家の5時)
 VENT Spo!(VENTスポ!)
 Kurayami de aimasho(暗闇で逢いましょう)
 Yamanashi genki navi(やまなし元気ナビ)

Rival Stations

Radio
 FM Fuji(エフエム富士) - independent, formerly of JFN

TV
 UHF Television Yamanashi(UTY,テレビ山梨) - JNN

LINK
Yamanashi Broadcasting System

Television stations in Japan
Radio in Japan
Nippon News Network
Companies based in Yamanashi Prefecture
Mass media in Kōfu, Yamanashi
Radio stations established in 1954
Television channels and stations established in 1959